Kiruhura is a town in the Western Region of Uganda. It is the largest town in Kiruhura District and the site of the district headquarters.

Location
The coordinates of the town are 0°12'53.0"S, 30°46'12.0"E (Latitude:-0.214709; Longitude:30.769999).

Population
In 2002, the national population census put the town's population at about 10,240. In 2010, the Uganda Bureau of Statistics (UBOS) estimated the population at 13,500. In 2011, UBOS estimated the mid-year population at 14,000. In 2012, UBOS projected the town's population at 14,300. In 2020, UBOS estimated the midyear population of Kiruhura Town at 6,900, of whom 3,600 (52.2 percent) were male and 3,300 (47.8 percent) were females.

Points of interest
The following additional points of interest lie within the town limits or close to its edges:
 Kiruhura Town Hall, the building housing the town council offices
Rwakitura State House, the country home of President Yoweri Museveni, is located in Rwakitura, by road north-east of Kiruhura.

See also
Ankole sub-region
Kazo, Uganda
Rushere, Uganda
Sanga Town

References

External links
 Road Construction Project Breeds Misers In Kiruhura

Populated places in Western Region, Uganda
Kiruhura District
Ankole sub-region